WLTG (1430 AM) is a radio station broadcasting a Spanish Christian format. Licensed to Upper Grand Lagoon, Florida, United States, the station serves the Panama City area. WLTG has the distinction of being one of the radio stations with the lowest daytime power of any licensed AM station in the USA. It is one of few radio stations with a daytime power less than 250 watts. The station is currently owned by Laurie Broadcasting, Inc.

History
The station went on the air as WPCF on December 11, 1949, as an affiliate of the ABC Radio Network. The callsign originally stood for "Panama City, Florida". The signal shifted from 1400 to 1430 kHz in 1958; the change enabled a power increase from 250 to 5,000 watts.

From the 1950s until 1971, the station experimented with Christian programming numerous times. PCF would come to stand for Put Christ First (this would be marketed even after its move to 1290 kHz in 1979 up until its call sign change in 1994.) From 1971 to 1975, WPCF was an affiliate of the "Happy Day Radio" network, a syndicated Top 40 format initially established by jocks of WRC, but between then and 1978, what its format was changed to is unknown.

On June 7, 1978, WPCF became WWWQ, and began broadcasting under an AC format under the name 3WQ. On September 15, 1982, keeping the 3WQ moniker, its format switched to country. This lasted until March 11, 1985, when the station changed its call sign to WKSD and again on February 19, 1986, to WLTG. WLTG was originally a Contemporary Christian station which would occasionally broadcast baseball and football games (mostly those of the Atlanta Braves). In mid-1991, the format was switched to CNN Headline News. The independent "NewsTalk 1430" branding has persisted since the early 2000s.

On December 28, 2018, a permit was granted to construct an FM translator for the station. This new signal, located on 101.7 MHz, launched under the callsign W269DR on January 1, 2019.

On September 23, 2020, WLTG changed their format from news/talk to rhythmic contemporary, branded as "Hot 101.7". Effective October 29, 2020, the station was granted authorization for its new community of license, moving from Panama City to Upper Grand Lagoon, and the transmitter power was downgraded from 5,000 watts to 125 watts day, and 60 watts night.

On July 12, 2021, WLTG changed their format from rhythmic contemporary to tropical rock. Effective August 1, 2021, the station flipped to a simulcast of Spanish Christian “Radio Fe” heard on WFRF, operated under a lease by Faith Broadcasting.

Previous logo

References

External links
WLTG official website

Radio stations established in 1949
LTG
1949 establishments in Florida